Colin Ross (born 29 August 1962) is a Scottish former footballer who played as a midfielder in the Football League for Middlesbrough, Chesterfield and Darlington. He joined Middlesbrough from Ayr United Boys Club in 1978, and after leaving Darlington played non-league football for South Bank and Whitby Town.

According to the Observer, "Ross hobbled into the record books after hurting his knee and being substituted just five seconds into [Darlington's] match with Chester" in October 1983.

References

1962 births
Living people
Footballers from South Ayrshire
Scottish footballers
Association football midfielders
Middlesbrough F.C. players
Chesterfield F.C. players
Darlington F.C. players
South Bank F.C. players
Whitby Town F.C. players
English Football League players